Jeremy Samuel Heyl is an astronomer and a professor at the University of British Columbia's Department of Physics and Astronomy, in Vancouver, British Columbia.  He holds a Canada Research Chair in Black Holes and Neutron Stars.  In the past he was a Goldwater Scholar, a Marshall Scholar and a Chandra Fellow.

Heyl is best known for his work in the physics of neutron stars especially the importance of quantum electrodynamics in radiative transfer, non-radial oscillations during Type-I X-ray bursts and the cooling of magnetars.   He has also made important contributions to our understanding of galaxy formation, evolution and mergers.

References

External links 
 http://www.phas.ubc.ca/~heyl
 Canada Research Chair profile 

Living people
21st-century American astronomers
21st-century Canadian astronomers
Canada Research Chairs
Academic staff of the University of British Columbia
Marshall Scholars
Year of birth missing (living people)
Alumni of the University of Cambridge